The Sugar Creek Wind Farm is a 57-turbine wind farm in western Logan County in the U.S. state of Illinois.  The project was developed by Liberty Power, a subsidiary of Algonquin Power and Utilities.

Detail
The Sugar Creek complex's 57 wind turbines were completed in December 2019.  Of the 57 turbines, 40 are rated at 4.2 mW, and 17 are rated at 2.0 mW.  The turbines were raised in 2019-2020, and have an expected lifespan of 30+ years.<ref name=  The turbines can generate up to 202.0 megawatts of electricity.

References

Energy infrastructure completed in 2020
Wind farms in Illinois
Buildings and structures in Logan County, Illinois